Karumady is a village three km east of Ambalappuzha in Alappuzha district of the Indian state of Kerala. It is famous for Karumady Kuttan, the eleventh century black granite statue of Sri Buddha. The left hand side of this statue is missing.

Demographics
 India census, Karumady had a population of 13,355 with 6,321 males and 7,034 females.

See also
 List of State Protected Monuments in Kerala

References

Villages in Alappuzha district